Mamath Eka Malak is a Sinhala autism song composed by the Sri Lankan musician, Rukshan Karunanayake. The song was released on Sunday 9 February 2014 to mark Autism Sunday 2014 in Sri Lanka. 'Mamath Eka Malak' is the first Sinhala autism song from the Commonwealth of Nations in 2014. It is a tribute in song to children and adults who are on the autism spectrum. The song is all about the beauty and brokenness of autism. Like a flower, people with autism need to be loved, appreciated and accepted.

This historic autism song won a Global Autism Award from the United Kingdom for highlighting the condition to mark Autism Sunday. 'Mamath Eka Malak' was dedicated to Charin Corea, son of the international autism campaigners Ivan and Charika Corea (who founded the global event Autism Sunday) and to all children and adults with autism on the island of Sri Lanka.

Lyrics : Rev. Sr. Niroshi Dilhari
Melody & Music Directions : Rukshan Karunanayake
Vocals : B.M. Madhubashini
Backed by : Rukshan Karunanayake (Lead/Rhythm Guitar), Sugath Asanka (Keyboards), Condrad De Silva (Bass Guitar), Udesha Karunanayake (Drums)
Recorded, Mixed & Mastered by Rukshan Karunanayake at Studio Udeshan.

Listen to a clip of the hit 'Mamath Eka Malak' here:
 MP3 on the Sinhala autism song.

Watch Rukshan Karunanayake unveiling 'Mamath Eka Malak,' on prime time television in Sri Lanka on the Rise & Shine TV programme on Channel Eye Television on YouTube:

Film on 'Mamath Eka Malak' on YouTube for Autism Sunday 2014:

See also
Autism Sunday
Autism Awareness Campaign UK
Autism

References

External links
 Rukshan's Mamath Eka Malak Bags Global Autism Award
 Rise & Shine on Channel Eye Television features Mamath Eka Malak
 Daily Mirror Sri Lanka publishes feature on Rukshan's historic autism song from The Commonwealth

2014 singles
2014 songs